The 1953 Maryland Terrapins football team represented the University of Maryland in the 1953 college football season in its first season as a member of the Atlantic Coast Conference (ACC). Maryland outscored its opponents 298–38 and recorded six defensive shutouts. Jim Tatum served as the head coach for the seventh year of his nine-year tenure. In the postseason, Maryland lost to Oklahoma in the 1954 Orange Bowl. The team was selected national champion by Associated Press, International News Service, and United Press International, leading to a consensus national champion designation.

Schedule

Personnel
The 1953 team consisted of the following letterwinners:

George Albrecht
Ralph Baierl
Lynn Beightol
Dick Bielski
Ray Blackburn
Jack Bowersox
Charles Boxold
Don Brougher
Dick Burgee
Marty Crytzer
Russell Dennis
Bernie Faloney
Ralph Felton
Tim Flynn
Chet Hanulak
Fred Heffner
Herb Hoffman
Joe Horning
John Irvine
Stan Jones
Jim Kilgallen
Paul Kramer
Tom McLuckie
Bob Morgan
Dick Nolan
Dave Nusz
George Palahunik
Jim Parsons
Bob Pellegrini
Richard Shipley
Ed Vereb
Ron Waller
Bill Walker
John Weiciecowski

The coaching staff consisted of:
Jim Tatum, head coach
Emmett Cheek
Warren Giese, ends
Jack Hennemier, defensive line
Tommy Mont, backfield
Vernon Seibert
Eddie Teague, defensive backfield
Bob Ward

References

Maryland
Maryland Terrapins football seasons
College football national champions
Atlantic Coast Conference football champion seasons
Maryland Terrapins football